Koh-Lanta: La Revanche des Héros (in English The Revenge of the Heroes) is the 3rd special season of the French version of Survivor, Koh-lanta. This season takes place in Cambodia on the island of Koh Rong, and was broadcast on TF1 in April 2012, every Friday at 8:45pm (7:45 p.m. GMT).

This season includes contestants of old season of Koh-Lanta who had not won. This season survival conditions are harder: they begin the game without rice, they can't win the fire (they have to make it) and one of the immunity challenges is a playoff.

Finishing order

Future appearances
Isabelle Da Silva, Freddy Boucher and Teheiura Teahui returned for Koh-Lanta: La Nouvelle Édition. Teahui returned once again alongside Claude Dartois and Moussa Niangane for Koh-Lanta: L'Île des héros. Boucher returned alongside Teahui, Patrick Merle, Coumba Baradji, and Dartois to compete in Koh-Lanta: La Légende.

Challenges

Elimination table 

Notes :
 A black background indicates the black vote.

Ratings 
This 3rd special season will be broadcast on TF1 every Friday at 8:45pm.

Green background = best viewing numbers
Red background = worst viewing numbers

References

External links
 Official site 

2012 French television seasons
03.1
Television shows filmed in Cambodia